In baseball, a strikeout occurs when a pitcher throws three strikes to a batter during his time at bat.  Under Rules 6.05 and 6.09 of the Official Rules of Major League Baseball, a batter becomes a runner when a third strike is not caught by the catcher with no runner on first base or when there are two outs.  The strikeout is recorded, but the batter-runner must be tagged or forced out in order for the defensive team to register the out.  Thus, it is possible for a pitcher to record more than three strikeouts in an inning.  As a result of this rule, 93 different pitchers have struck out four batters in a half-inning of a Major League Baseball (MLB) game, the most recent being Chris Martin of the Los Angeles Dodgers on August 15, 2022.  Four players — Chuck Finley, A. J. Burnett, Zack Greinke, and Craig Kimbrel — have accomplished the feat more than once in their career; no player has ever struck out more than four batters in an inning. Ed Crane was the first player to strike out four batters in one inning, doing so in the fifth inning for the New York Giants against the Chicago White Stockings on October 4, 1888.

Out of the 93 pitchers who have accomplished the feat, 71 were right-handed and 22 were left-handed.  Three pitchers—Bob Gibson, Walter Johnson and Phil Niekro—are also members of the 3,000 strikeout club.  Finley is the only pitcher to achieve the feat on three separate occasions, as well as twice in a single season. Pete Richert struck out four batters in the third inning of his first major league game, becoming the only player to attain the milestone in his debut. Orval Overall is the sole player to strike out four batters in one inning in the World Series.

Of the players eligible for the Baseball Hall of Fame who have struck out four batters in an inning, four have been elected and two were elected on the first ballot. Players are eligible for the Hall of Fame if they have played in at least 10 major league seasons, and have either been retired for five seasons or dead for at least six months.

Players

See also

 List of Major League Baseball pitchers who have struck out three batters on nine pitches

Notes

References
General

Specific

Major League Baseball lists
Major League Baseball records
Major League Baseball statistics